Nurettin Sözen (born 1937 in Gürün) is a Turkish doctor, politician and the former mayor of Istanbul, Turkey.

He graduated from Istanbul University and then became a professor in 1978. He was elected as the mayor of Istanbul on March 28, 1989 while he was a member of SHP. He stayed in the office until March 27, 1994. He didn't take any active political missions until he was elected as the deputy of Sivas, his homeland, in 2002. Sözen is a member of Republican People's Party.

He is married and has a child.

References
 Istanbul University, Cerrahpaşa Faculty of Medicine - Biography of Nurettin Sözen 

1937 births
Deputies of Sivas
Istanbul High School alumni
Academic staff of Istanbul University
Istanbul University Faculty of Medicine alumni
Living people
Mayors of Istanbul
Members of the 22nd Parliament of Turkey
People from Gürün
Republican People's Party (Turkey) politicians
Social Democratic People's Party (Turkey) politicians
20th-century Turkish physicians